Henry Hitchcock (3 July 1829 – 18 March 1902) was a lawyer from St. Louis, Missouri.

Born in Spring Hill, near Mobile, Alabama, he was the great-grandson of Ethan Allen. His father, also named Henry Hitchcock, was born in Burlington, Vermont, and was named Secretary of the Territory of Alabama, and later was successively Attorney General and Chief Justice of the State of Alabama. His brother, Ethan Hitchcock, was Secretary of the Interior under Presidents William McKinley and Theodore Roosevelt.

Hitchcock attended the University of Nashville and Yale University. He studied law in the office of Willis Hall, Corporation Counsel of New York City, and the office of William F. Cooper, who later became a Justice of the Supreme Court of Tennessee. He settled in St. Louis, Missouri, where he was admitted to the bar.

He was active in opposing slavery, and took part in the provisional Missouri state government during the Civil War. He entered the army and served as Judge Advocate on the personal staff of General Sherman, and was present on Sherman's March to the Sea. Excerpts from Hitchcock's letters and diaries of this period were published in 1927 by Yale University Press and are historically significant.

An early president of the Bar Association of Metropolitan St. Louis, Hitchcock was a co-founder of the American Bar Association in 1878. He became the twelfth president of the association in 1889.  Hitchcock was elected a member of the American Antiquarian Society in 1882. In 1889, President Benjamin Harrison considered appointing him to the United States Supreme Court, but chose David J. Brewer instead.

Further reading
 Bar Association of St. Louis, Memorial. Henry Hitchcock, 1829-1902, 1902.
 Walter B. Stevens, Centennial History of Missouri, St. Louis:  S. J. Clarke Publishing Company, 1921, Vol. II, pp. 164-165.

Notes and references

Lawyers from St. Louis
Union Army officers
Presidents of the American Bar Association
1829 births
1902 deaths
Members of the American Antiquarian Society